Vita van der Linden (born 4 January 1997) is a Dutch footballer, who plays as a midfielder for Ajax of the Eredivisie in the Netherlands.

Club career
In July 2019 van der Linden transferred to Bristol City from Ajax.

References

External links

 

1997 births
Living people
Dutch women's footballers
Bristol City W.F.C. players
Women's association football midfielders
Expatriate women's footballers in England
Eredivisie (women) players
Footballers from Nijmegen
Dutch expatriate sportspeople in England
AFC Ajax (women) players
PSV (women) players
BeNe League players
Dutch expatriate women's footballers
SV Orion players
Stade de Reims Féminines players
Dutch expatriate sportspeople in France
Expatriate women's footballers in France
Division 1 Féminine players
21st-century Dutch women